ʿAlī ibn al-Ḥusayn Zayn al-ʿĀbidīn, also known as al-Sajjād or simply as Zayn al-ʿĀbidīn, was an Imam in Shiʻi Islam after his father Husayn ibn Ali, his uncle Hasan ibn Ali, and his grandfather, Ali ibn Abi Talib.

Ali ibn al-Husayn survived the Battle of Karbala in 680 CE, after which he and the other survivors were taken to Yazid I in Damascus. He was eventually allowed to return to Medina, where he led a secluded life with a few close companions. He devoted his life to prayer and was regarded as an authority on law and hadith. Some of his supplications are collected in Al-Sahifa al-Sajjadiyya, which is highly regarded by the Shia. He adopted a quiescent attitude towards the Umayyads and is seen by the Shia community as an example of patience and perseverance when numerical odds are against them.

Name and epithets
His name was Ali, though Husayn had two other sons named Ali, who were both killed in Karbala. The first was an infant, referred to as Ali al-Asghar in the Shia literature. The second one was Ali al-Akbar though some historians, such as al-Qadi al-Nu'man, maintain that Zayn al-Abidin was the eldest brother. Some Sunni historians, including Ibn Sa'd, Ibn Qutaybah, al-Baladhuri and al-Tabari, refer to Zayn al-Abidin as Ali al-Asghar.

According to Kohlberg, Ali's  is reported differently as Abu al-Ḥasan, Abu al-Ḥusayn, Abu Muḥammad, Abu Bakr, and Abu Abd Allah. He was given the honorific al-Sajjad, as well as Zayn al-Abidin, and al-Zaki. He also became known as Dul-tafenat in reference to the calluses formed on his forehead from frequent prostration.

Ancestry

Ali was born to Husayn, who was the third Shia Imam after his brother Hasan, the second Shia Imam, and their father, Ali, the first Shia Imam.
Ali's mother is named variously as Barra, Gazala, Solafa, Salama, Sahzanan, and Sahbanuya. According to Ibn Qutaybah, Ali was born to a (freed) concubine from Sind. Shia sources, however, maintain that Ali's mother was the daughter of Yazdegerd III, the last Sasanian Emperor. These traditions refer to Ali as Ibn al-Khiyaratayn, signifying the union of the Quraysh, representing the Arabs, and the Persians, representing non-Arabs. According to some accounts, Shahrbanu, daughter of Yazdegerd III, was brought as a captive to Medina during the caliphate of Umar, who wanted to sell her. Ali, however, suggested allowing her to choose her husband, to which Umar agreed and she chose Ali's son, Husayn. She is said to have died shortly after giving birth to her only son, Ali.

Life

Ali ibn al-Husayn was about two years old when his grandfather, Ali, died. He lived ten years during the imamate of his uncle, Hasan, and ten years during the imamate of his father, Husayn. His own imamate lasted for thirty-five years and he died in 94 or 95 AH at the age of fifty-seven, during the caliphate of al-Walid I or his younger brother, Hisham.

Birth and early life
Most sources report that Ali ibn al-Husayn was born in Medina in 38 AH (658–9 CE). He may have been too young to have remembered his grandfather, Ali, and was raised in the presence of his uncle, Hasan, and his father, Husayn, who were Muhammad's two grandchildren.

In Karbala

In 61 AH (680 CE), Muhammad's grandson, Husayn, and a small group of supporters and relatives were massacred in the Battle of Karbala by the large army of the Umayyad Caliph Yazid I, to whom Husayn had refused to pledge an oath of allegiance. Ali ibn al-Husayn was present in Karbala but too ill to participate in the fighting. After killing Husayn and his supporters, the Umayyad troops looted his camp and found Ali ibn al-Husayn lying deathly ill in one of the tents. Shimr is said to have wanted to kill him but his aunt, Zaynab, appealed to Umar ibn Sa'ad, the Umayyad commander, to spare his life and the latter let him be.

In Kufa
After the battle, Ali ibn al-Husayn and the women and children were marched to Kufa as captives, alongside the heads of Husayn and his supporters. According to the Shia author al-Shaykh al-Mufid, the captives were carried on bare camels and chains were placed around Ali's bleeding neck while he was sapped by illness. Kufan women began to cry at the sight of the captives, and Ali is said to have commented that, "They are weeping and lamenting over us! So who has killed us?" 

The governor of Kufa, Ubayd Allah ibn Ziyad, is known to have treated the captives with considerable contempt. Ibn Ziyad at first intended to kill Ali but was dissuaded. Sharif al-Qarashi writes that, under the impression that all sons of Husayn were killed in Karbala, Ibn Ziyad asked Ali, "Did not God kill Ali ibn al-Husayn?" To this, Ali responded, "I used to have an older brother, also named Ali [al-Akbar], whom you killed. He will request you on the Day of Judgment." "God killed him," shouted Ibn Ziyad. Ali then quoted from verses 39:42 and 3:145 of the Quran, "God takes the souls away at the time of their death; none dies except with God’s permission," which implies that God does not kill. Ibn Ziyad was angered by this response and ordered Ali to be executed. He was, however, saved after Husayn's sister, Zaynab, pleaded with Ibn Ziyad.

In Damascus 

Ali and the other survivors were then sent to Yazid in Damascus, who addressed the captives harshly, to which Ali and Zaynab responded in kind. Yazid, however, is said to have regretted the massacre later, possibly fearing the public outcry. He sent the descendants of Muhammad back to Medina after compensating them for their stolen property. Additional details are offered by Shia sources. For instance, it is related that Yazid celebrated the occasion, brought the captives before his guests, and publicly gloated over the head of Husayn. Ali asked permission to deliver a speech, which was not granted. Yazid, however, relented at the request of his guests and Ali defended the Ahl al-Bayt in a speech which was interrupted, at Yazid's order, by the call to prayer. When the  announced, "I bear witness that Muhammad is the Messenger of God," Ali ibn al-Husayn asked:
The Mashhad Ali, forming part of the great mosque in Damascus, is said to mark where Ali was incarcerated.

Aftermath of Karbala
Ali led a quiet life upon his return to Medina, confining himself to a limited circle of followers who referred to him for religious matters. He took aloof from political activities and dedicated his time to prayer, which earned him the honorifics Zayn al-Abidin and Sajjad. According to Chittick, Zayn al-Abidin spent his time in worship and learning, was an authority on law and hadith, and best known for his virtuous character and piety.

Several accounts record Zayn al-Abidin's deep sorrow over the massacre. It is said that for thirty-four years after the events in Karbala, Ali would weep when food was placed before him. When asked if it was not time for his sorrows to come to an end, he made a reference to verse 12:84 of the Quran: "Jacob, the prophet, had twelve sons, and God made one of them disappear. His eyes turned white from constant weeping, his head turned grey out of sorrow, and his back became bent in the gloom, though his son was alive. But I watched while my father, my brother, my uncle, and seventeen members of my family were slaughtered all around me. How should my sorrow come to an end?"

Ibn Zubayr's revolt 

The atrocities of Karbala were related by its survivors and Abd Allah ibn al-Zubayr soon aroused the indignant people of Medina and later Mecca to revolt against the Umayyads. Medinan forces were, however, crushed by the Umayyad army in the Battle of al-Harra. 

Zayn al-Abidin kept his distance from both the Umayyad and Zubayri authorities. During the uprising, according to Jafri, he left Medina to emphasize his neutrality. After the Medinans' defeat in the Battle of al-Harra, unlike others, Ali was exempted from a renewed oath of allegiance to Yazid. This exemption was in part because he sheltered the Umayyad Marwan and his family on one occasion.

Tawwabin's revolt 

The massacre of Karbala in 61 AH had a profound impact on the Shia. The Tawwabin in Kufa, led by Sulayman ibn Surad, was the first Shia group that sought to atone for their failure to assist Husayn and deliver the caliphate to Zayn al-Abidin. They remained underground until 65 AH and then marched against and were defeated by the much larger Umayyad army after three days of heavy fighting. Sulayman was killed in the battle. There is no evidence of Ali's involvement in this uprising.

Mokhtar's revolt 

Mukhtar al-Thaqafi arrived in Kufa in 64 AH, shortly before the Tawwabin's revolt, and campaigned among the Shia for the imamate of Muhammad ibn al-Hanafiyya, a son of the first Imam, Ali, but not with Fatima. After the defeat of the Tawwabun and in the absence of any alternatives, the campaign of Mukhtar grew in popularity and he eventually took over Kufa in 66 AH. Mukhtar chased down and killed those responsible for the massacre of Karbala, including Umar ibn Sa'ad and Shimr. According to Madelung, however, Mukhtar most likely sent their heads to Ibn al-Hanafiyya, rather than Zayn al-Abidin. Ibn Ziyad was also killed in battle and his head was taken to the same place in Kufa where Ibn Ziyad had received the head of Husayn. Mukhtar himself was killed in battle by Ibn Zubayr in 67 or 68 AH. Ibn Zubayr, however, did not view Zayn al-Abedin as responsible for Mukhtar's uprising and thus left him unharmed. Similarly, Zayn al-Abidin was not harmed by the Umayyad al-Hajjaj when the latter defeated and killed Ibn Zubayr, following the siege of Mecca in 73 AH.

Succession to Husayn

Among the descendants of Muhammad, Ali was the natural candidate for the imamate as the only surviving son of Husayn after Karbala. Though he cannot accept or reject them, Jafri also lists a number of Shia traditions about the appointment of Ali as the next Imam by his father, Husayn. Nevertheless, after the death of Husayn, a number of factions within the Shia, including the Tawwabin, felt that the Umayyad Caliphate should be overthrown and that it fell to Imam to lead the rebellion. As a result of Zayn al-Abidin's quiescent policy, those groups rallied behind Mokhtar who revolted under the auspices of Muhammad ibn al-Hanafiyyah. Shia sources, however, emphasize that Mokhtar turned to Ibn al-Hanafiyaah only after only the rejection by Zayn al-Abidin. 

For his part, Ibn al-Hanafiyaah neither repudiated Mukhtar's propaganda nor made any public claims about succession to Husayn. Jafri suggests that Ibn al-Hanafiyaah, not being a descendant of Muhammad, might have been unwilling to claim the imamate for himself. Donaldson recounts a Shia tradition which describes how Zayn al-Abedin and Ibn Hanafiyyah agreed to appeal to the sacred Black Stone of the Kaaba to determine which of the two was the true successor. There, Ibn Hanafiyyah prayed for a sign to no avail. Zayn al-Abedin's prayer was, however, answered and the Black Stone spoke in favor of his imamate. The tradition notes that the miracle satisfied Ibn Hanafiyyah.
Abu Khalid al-Kabuli, a companion of Ibn Hanafiah, turned to Zayn al-Abidin afterwards. In addition to Abu Khalid, Shia sources list Qasim ibn Awf and a few others among the prominent Shias who abandoned Ibn al-Hanafiyyah. Ismailils maintain that Ibn Hanafiah was appointed by Husayn as a temporary Imam and a cover to protect the true Imam, Zayn al-Abidin. 

The question of rightful succession to Husayn, as between his son and Ibn al-Hanafiyyah, divided the Shia and diverted considerable support away from Zayn al-Abidin, at least until the death of al-Zubayr and, with it, the collapse of the political ambitions of the people of Hejaz and Iraq. Kasaniyya is a name given to all sects originated from Mokhtar's revolt who trace the imamate through Muhammad ibn al-Hanafiyyah and his successors. The Kaysaniyya itself is divided to different sects, though its common view is that Hasan, Husayn, and Ibn Hanfiyyah were the true successors of Ali. However, some extreme sects within the Kaysaniyya reject the imamate of Hasan and Husayn.

When Ibn Hanafiyyah died in 81 AH, some of his followers, who became known as the Karbiyya, came to believe that Ibn Hanafiyyah had not died but was in concealment at a mountain near Medina, and would reappear again as Mahdi to fill the earth with justice. Another group, called the Hashemiyya, admitted that Ibn Hanafiyya was dead and followed his son, Abu Hashim. All Keysaniyya sects are distinguished by the love for Ali and his family and the hatred for ruling dynasty. According to Kohlberg, when Ibn Hanafiyya died, some Kaysanites joined Zayn al-Abidin.

Family
Ali ibn al-Husayn is said to have between eight and fifteen children, of whom four sons were born to Umm Abd Allah Fatima bint Hasan and the others were from concubines. According to Chittick, Zayn al-Abidin fathered fifteen children, eleven boys and four girls. Al-Shaykh al-Mufid reports their names as Muhammad al-Baqir, Zayd, Hasan, Husayn al-Akbar, Husayn al-Asghar, Abd Allah, Abd al-Rahman, Sulayman, Muhammad al-Asghar, Umar al-Ashraf, Ali, Umm Kulthum, Khadija, Fatima and Aliyya.

Death

Zayn al-Abidin is said to have been poisoned in Medina at the instigation of the reigning Umayyad caliph, al-Walid, or his brother, Hisham. The year of his death is reported as 94 AH (712 CE) or 95 (713) and he is buried next to his uncle, Hasan, in the al-Baqi' cemetery in Medina. According to Madelung, after his death, many people discovered that their livelihoods had come from Ali. He would go out every night with a sack of food on his back, knocking at the doors of the poor, and gave freely to whoever answered while covering his face to remain anonymous.

Successor
According to Jafri, it is widely reported that Zayn al-Abidin designated his eldest son, Muhammad al-Baqir, as the next Imam before his death. Zayd, a half-brother of Muhammad al-Baqir, also asserted a claim to the imamate, saying that the title can belong to any descendant of Hasan or Husayn who is learned, pious, and revolts against the tyrants of his time. On this basis, his followers, known as Zaydis, consider Zayd as the rightful successor to Zayn al-Abidin, though Zayn al-Abidin himself did not revolt against the Umayyads and instead adopted a policy of quiescence. Initially, Zayd's activist approach gained him a large following. However, as he increasingly compromised with the traditionalists, some of Zayd's supporters are said to have returned to Muhammad al-Baqir. Eventually, Zayd took up arms against the Umayyads in 122 AH and was killed in Kufa by the forces of Caliph Hisham. Muhammad al-Baqir, in contrast, opted for a policy of quiescence like his father.

Social status
Despite the large following of Muhammad ibn al-Hanafiya, Muslims and particularly the learned circles of Medina appear to have held Ali in great respect, particularly as Muhammad's great grandson and a prominent traditionist. A number of leading jurists of the time, such as al-Zuhri and Said ibn al-Musayyib, were among the close associates of Ali and he also appears as a transmitter of hadith in Sunni sources. Al-Zuhri, in particular, described Ali as the most excellent of the Hashimites and gave him the honorific name Zayn al-Abidin. Salahi writes that the renowned jurist Malik ibn Anas regarded Ali as "a sea full of knowledge." According to Jafri, overwhelming evidence suggests that Ali was widely respected in the Muslim community for his piety, his forbearance, his learning, and his generosity. 

Farazdaq, a renowned poet of the time, is said to have composed multiple poems in praise of Ali. Among them is the ode that describes the occasion when the future caliph, Hisham, visited Mecca but was unable to access the Kaaba through the crowds. To Hisham's ire, however, the crowds parted out of respect for Ali and allowed the latter unobstructed access to the Kaaba.

Personality
In appearance, Ali ibn al-Husayn resembled his grandfather, Ali, with the same height, reddish hair, white face and neck, and wide chest and stomach.

Donaldson writes that Ali was distinct in his devotion to prayer and his extreme sorrow for the massacre of Karbala. When the time of prayer approached, he would go pale, trembling in fear of God. His frequent prostrations in worship earned Ali the honorific names Sajjad, Zayn al-Abedin, and Ḏul-tafenat. It has been repeatedly narrated that at nights, in order not to be recognized, he would cover his face and distribute charity to poor households. It was only after his death that people discovered the identity of their benefactor.

Ali is said to have bought and freed dozens of slaves in his life. Donaldson describes the occasion when a slave accidentally spilled hot soup over Ali and he freed the slave instead of scolding him. Kohlberg writes that even though Hisham ibn Isma'il, the governor of Medina, was abusive to Ali, the latter forbade his family and friends from speaking ill of Hisham when he was dismissed by the caliph. 

The Shia writer Sharif al-Qarashi believes that Zayn al-Abidin renounced worldly pleasures without giving in to poverty and feebleness. In one account, when Ali saw a beggar crying, he consoled him by telling him that even if he had lost the whole world, it would still not be worth crying for. Al-Zuhri, the renowned Arab jurist, reportedly described Zayn al-Abidin as the most ascetic of all people. In view of his piety, Sufi authors have written about Ali. When asked about it, Zayn al-Abidin replied that asceticism was summarized in one verse (57:23) of the Quran, "Hence that you may not grieve for what has escaped you, nor be exultant at what He has given you."

Works

Al-Sahifa al-Sajjadiyya
According to Chittick, Al-Sahifa al-Sajjadiyya is the oldest collection of Islamic prayers and a seminal work in Islamic spirituality. Shia tradition regards this book with great respect, ranking it behind the Quran and Ali's Nahj al-Balagha. Fifty-four supplications form the main body of the book, which also includes an addenda of fourteen supplications and fifteen s. The book, attributed to Ali, is often regarded as authentic by the specialists in the science of hadith. Jafri believes that these supplications teach us the essence of Islamic spirituality and embody the answers to many questions faced by both the man of Ali's time and the man of our age.

While the supplicatory form of Al-Sahifa emphasizes the spirituality of Islam, the book also provides a broad range of teachings about the faith, from theological to social. For instance, according to Chittick, among the existing works, the prayer "Blessing Upon the Bearers of the Throne" best summarizes the Islamic views about angels. The book also refers frequently to Islamic practices, emphasizing the necessity of implementing the guidelines of the Quran and the hadith literature, as well as the importance of social justice. The book was translated into Persian during the Safavid era and an English translation of the book, entitled The Psalms of Islam, is also available with an introduction and annotations by William Chittick. Numerous commentaries have been written about Al-Sahifa.

Supplication of Abu Hamza al-Thumali
This supplication is attributed to Ali, who is said to have taught it to his companion, Abu Hamzah al-Thumali, and is to be recited at dawn or night during the month of Ramadan. This supplication has been recorded in Misbah al-Mutahijjid of Shaykh Tusi and Shia authors have written several commentaries for it.

Resalat al-Hoquq
{{Quote box
| width = 25%
| align = right
| bgcolor = #FFFFF0
| salign = right
| quote = The right of charity (sadaqa) is that you know it is a storing away with your Lord and a deposit for which you will have no need for witnesses. If you deposit it in secret, you will be more confident of it than if you deposit it in public. You should know that it repels afflictions and illnesses from you in this world and it will repel the Fire from you in the next world."
| source = Zayn al-Abidin
}}Resalat al-Hoquq'', on social and religious responsibilities, is the only work other than supplications, short sayings and letters, that has been ascribed to Ali. Available in two versions, the book is said to have been written by Ali at the request of a disciple. It exhaustively describes the rights God has upon humans and the rights humans have upon themselves and on each other, based on the Quran and the hadith literature. The book advances a certain hierarchy of priorities: The individual comes before the social, the spiritual before the practical, and knowledge before action. Each human being must observe a long list of social duties, but these predicate on more basic duties, namely, faith in God and obedience to Him.

Miracles
In Shia sources, a number of miracles are attributed to Ali, including the speaking of the Black Stone in favor of his claim to the imamate in the presence of Muhammad ibn al-Hanafiyyah, his speaking to a gazelle in the desert, and restoring youth to an old woman.

See also

Family tree of Ali
Ahl al-Bayt
 Family tree of Muhammad
Supplication of Abu Hamza al-Thumali

Notes

References

Sources

External links

As-Sahifa Al-Sajjadiyya
Risalat al-Huquq
Dua Abu Hamza Thumali
The Whispered Prayers in Arabic, English, and Urdu
The Whispered Prayers (English Audio)
Life of Imam az-Zayn al-Abideen as-Sajjad by Dr. Muhammad bin Yahya al-Ninowy 
Imam Ali Ibn al Husayn by al-Shaykh al-Mufid

659 births
713 deaths
Twelve Imams
7th-century imams
8th-century imams
Deaths by poisoning
Husaynids
Karbala
Shia imams
Assassinated royalty
Arab people of Iranian descent
7th-century Arabs
8th-century Arabs
Tabi‘un hadith narrators
7th-century people from the Umayyad Caliphate
8th-century people from the Umayyad Caliphate
Burials at Jannat al-Baqī